Greg Swann (born 1962) is an Australian Football League (AFL) chief executive officer of the Brisbane Lions, an Australian rules football club based in Brisbane competing in the Australian Football League. He has been in the role since July 2014.

Administration career
From 1995 until 1998, he was the president of VFA/VFL club Williamstown, presiding over the club when the VSFL attempted to force the club into a merger with Werribee at the end of 1995; he had previously played about 100 games for Williamstown during the 1980s.

Collingwood Football Club
Swann was previously Chief Executive Officer (CEO) of the Collingwood Football Club from 1999 until 2007. Swann in his tenure as CEO of Collingwood, oversaw improved on-field results after lifting Collingwood up from the bottom of the ladder, the previous years, by being a strong supporter of club president Eddie McGuire, club senior coach Mick Malthouse and club captain Nathan Buckley. Swann in his tenure as CEO of Collingwood Football Club, also oversaw Collingwood's two grand final losses in the 2002 Grand Final and 2003 Grand Final, both times to Brisbane Lions.  Swann in his tenure as CEO of Collingwood in the off-field position area, also oversaw the development and construction of the club's new training and administrative facilities at the Lexus Centre and Olympic Park in 2004.
On 23 March 2007, Swann stepped down as CEO of Collingwood Football Club.

Carlton Football Club
Swann was also previously the CEO of Carlton Football Club. On 23 March 2007, former Carlton Football Club CEO Michael Malouf stood down and it was announced that Swann would be Malouf's immediate replacement. Swann in his tenure as CEO of Carlton, oversaw the trade of Chris Judd from West Coast Eagles to Carlton. Swann in his tenure as CEO of Carlton also oversaw the club prosper in the on and off field performances. Off the field, Swann witnessed the club's membership increase with the total revenue of the club that also increased from $18 million in 2006 to $57 million in 2013, while Carlton’s historical debt was also significantly reduced. Under Swann’s guidance, Carlton was also able to secure long-term deals with key major sponsors and build strong relationships with global brands including Hyundai, Mars and Nike.  Furthermore, Swann led the way in the redevelopment of the $18 million training facility that opened at Visy Park in 2010, working closely with federal, state and local governments, along with the AFL, to deliver a world-class training and administration facility. The on-field performance also witnessed successful results for the club where under Swann’s leadership as CEO, after finishing at second from the bottom of the ladder in 2007, Carlton managed to play finals in four out of five seasons in his tenure. Swann served as CEO of Carlton until 22 June 2014, electing to step down at the same time as club president Stephen Kernahan handed over his position to Mark LoGiudice.

Brisbane Lions
In July 2014, Swann was appointed CEO of Brisbane Lions. Swann in his tenure as CEO of Brisbane Lions has overseen the period at the club, where the Lions had dark periods where there was poor-on field performance and financially off-field struggles as well. The club then had to keep going to the AFL to get additional funding. The situation at the club, then slowly turned around with improved successful on-field results and a return to a stable position off-field.  Swann in his tenure as CEO of Brisbane Lions has also overseen the development and construction of the club's new training and administrative facility at The Reserve, Springfield.

Personal life
He attended Wesley College (Melbourne, Australia).

References

External links
 Official Website of the Carlton Football Club
 Profile from Blueseum

1962 births
Living people
Businesspeople from Melbourne
Carlton Football Club administrators
Collingwood Football Club administrators
Williamstown Football Club players
Australian chief executives
People educated at Wesley College (Victoria)